Dub Lemna, Gaelic-Irish female given name.

Bearers of the name

 Dub Lemna ingen Tighearnáin, Queen of Ireland, died 941.

External links
 http://medievalscotland.org/kmo/AnnalsIndex/Feminine/DubLemna.shtml

Irish-language feminine given names